Jerusalem is a film which was released to cinemas in Sweden on 6 September 1996, directed by Bille August, based on the two-part novel Jerusalem by Selma Lagerlöf. The film, also broadcast as a TV-series, was a Scandinavian co-production headed by Svensk Filmindustri. The film was selected as the Swedish entry for the Best Foreign Language Film at the 69th Academy Awards, but was not accepted as a nominee.

The cast includes Ulf Friberg, Sven-Bertil Taube, Maria Bonnevie, Pernilla August, Max von Sydow, Reine Brynolfsson, Lena Endre, Olympia Dukakis, Michael Nyqvist, Mona Malm, Sven Wollter, Hans Alfredson, Viveka Seldahl and Johan Rabaeus.

Plot
The novel and the film were inspired by real events from the end of the 19th century, a time when many people left Europe to find a better life abroad. The story revolves around a number of struggling families from northern Sweden who share a strong Christian belief in the impending end of the world. After a long journey, these families choose to settle on the outskirts of Jerusalem, where they take up farming and build a new future, waiting for Judgement Day. A series of claimed visions only add to the difficulty of life in their adopted country, and with growing hardship and the loss of family members, some in the group decide to return to Sweden, while others stay.

Cast

Ulf Friberg as Ingmar
Maria Bonnevie as Gertrud
Pernilla August as Karin
Reine Brynolfsson as Tim
Lena Endre as Barbro
Jan Mybrand as Gabriel
Sven-Bertil Taube as Helgum
Björn Granath as Storm
Viveka Seldahl as Stina
Mona Malm as Eva Gunnarsdotter
Hans Alfredson as Mats Hök
Max von Sydow as Vicar
Olympia Dukakis as Mrs. Gordon
Annika Borg as Gunhild
Johan Rabaeus as Eljas
Sven Wollter as Stor-Ingmar
Mats Dahlbäck as Hans Berger
Anders Nyström as Sven Persson
Claes Esphagen as Forrester
Fredrik Ohlsson as Lawyer
John Gunnarson as Jesus
Torsten Sjöholm as Gunnar Höök
Michael Nyqvist as Carpenter 1
Lasse Almebäck -	 Carpenter 2
André Beinö as childhood Ingmar (credited as André Beijnö)
Stina Wargert -	Gertrud as child
Sydnee Blake -	American woman
Mel Cobb -	American man
Nils Eklund -  Innkeeper
Lars Engström -	Doctor
Rolf Jenner -	Big man 1
Christer Flodin -	Big man 2
Viktor Friberg -	Saw worker
Douglas Johansson as Lars Tipers
Katherine Kjellgren -	American girl
Jan Sjödin -	Gabriel's father
Eva Stellby -	Gabriel's mother
Stina von Sydow as Servant girl
Cilla Thorell	 -  Russian girl
Amanda Steen -	Greta
Tindra Laurén -	Greta as a little girl
Galina Pavlovna Soboleva	- Russian woman
Valeri Dmitrievitj-Lisenkov -	Russian man 1
Pavel Oetrovitj-Ostroukhouv -	Russian man 2

Reception
The film was one of the most popular Swedish films of the year with a gross in excess of $2.3 million.

Awards
Lena Endre won the Swedish Guldbagge Award as Best Supporting Actress, and the film was nominated in several other categories.

See also
 List of submissions to the 69th Academy Awards for Best Foreign Language Film
 List of Swedish submissions for the Academy Award for Best Foreign Language Film

References

External links
 
 

1996 films
1996 drama films
Films based on Swedish novels
Films based on works by Selma Lagerlöf
Films directed by Bille August
Swedish drama films
Danish drama films
Norwegian drama films
1990s Swedish-language films
1990s Swedish films